Our Mutual Friend is the last novel completed by Charles Dickens.

Our Mutual Friend may also refer to:
 Our Mutual Friend (1958 TV serial), a British television mini-series
 Our Mutual Friend (1976 TV serial), a British television serial
 Our Mutual Friend (1998 TV serial), a British television serial
 "Our Mutual Friend," a song by Neil Hannon